Yogananda D. Pittman is an American law enforcement officer serving as assistant chief of the United States Capitol Police (USCP). She served as acting chief of the USCP from January 8 to July 23, 2021. Pittman's selection was made on January 8, 2021, following the 2021 storming of the United States Capitol and resignation of Steven Sund. Her term as acting chief ended at the time of the appointment of J. Thomas Manger.

Education 
Pittman earned a Bachelor of Science degree in psychology from Morgan State University in 1999. She later earned a Master of Public Administration from Marist College and is studying towards as Doctor of Public Administration at West Chester University.

Career 
She joined the Capitol Police in 2001. In 2012, Pittman was among the first black female supervisors to be promoted to the rank of captain in the Capitol Police. At that time, she was responsible for over 400 officers and civilian staff. The next year, she was in charge of the security planning for the second inauguration of Barack Obama. During her tenure, Pittman has been assigned to the United States Senate Division and most recently served as assistant chief of police for protective and intelligence operations. In 2020, Pittman received the Women in Federal Law Enforcement's Outstanding Advocate for Women award.

Following the resignation of Steven Sund in 2021, Pittman became acting chief of the Capitol Police. She is the first woman and first African American to lead the Capitol Police. On February 15, 2021 the U.S. Capitol Police Labor Committee, the union representing Capitol Police officers, voted 92% against Pittman in a vote of no confidence in her leadership.

On December 5, 2022, the University of California, Berkeley announced that Pittman would assume the role of chief of the Berkeley department of the UCPD, with her leadership beginning February 1, 2023.

References 

African-American police officers
Morgan State University alumni
Marist College alumni
United States Capitol Police officers
American women police officers
Living people
Year of birth missing (living people)
21st-century African-American people
21st-century African-American women